Armageddon is, according to the Bible, the site of a battle during the end times.

Armageddon may also refer to:

Films 
 [[Armageddon (1997 film)|Armageddon (1997 film)]], a Hong Kong film starring Andy Lau
 Armageddon (1998 film), an American disaster film starring Bruce Willis and Ben Affleck
 Armaguedon, a 1977 film directed by Alain Jessua
 Deathline or Armageddon, a 1997 science fiction action film starring Rutger Hauer
 Warlock: The Armageddon, a 1993 American horror film

 Games 
 Armageddon chess, a variant of chess
 Armageddon (MUD), a multi-player text-based online roleplaying game running since 1991
 Mortal Kombat: Armageddon, a 2006 video game in the Mortal Kombat series
 Red Faction: Armageddon, a 2011 video game in the Red Faction series
 Worms Armageddon, a 1999 video game in the Worms series
 Worms 2: Armageddon, a 2009 video game in the Worms series
 Armageddon: Tactical Combat, 3000-500 BC, a 1972 board wargame simulating Bronze Age warfare

 Literature 
 Armageddon (novel), a 2003 novel in the Left Behind series by Tim LaHaye and Jerry Jenkins
 Armageddon: A Novel of Berlin, a 1964 novel by Leon Uris
 Armageddon (underground comic), a comic book published by Last Gasp
 Armageddon 2001, a crossover event in the DC universe
 Wildstorm: Armageddon, a crossover event in the Wildstorm universe
 Armageddon, a 2004 novel in the Dreamland series by Dale Brown with Jim DeFelice
 Armageddon, a 1997 Battlestar Galactica novel by Richard Hatch
 Armageddon (1988–92), a series of three novels by Robert Rankin
 Armageddon: The Battle for Germany 1944-45, a 2004 historical book by Max Hastings
 Armageddon: The Second World War, a 1995 historical book by Clive Ponting
 Armageddon? (1987), essay anthology by Gore Vidal

 Music 
 Armageddon (Swedish band), a Swedish melodic death metal band
 Armageddon (British band), a 1970s hard rock supergroup
 Armageddon (Aria album), 2006
 Armageddon (Armageddon album), by the A&M band, 1975 
 Armageddon (Equilibrium album), 2016
 Armageddon (Guy Sebastian album), 2012
 Armageddon (Stromkern album), 2001
 Armageddon (Prism album), 1979
 "Armageddon", a jazz standard by Wayne Shorter from Night Dreamer, 1964
 "Armageddon", a song by Primal Fear from Black Sun "Armageddon", a song by Against Me! from Against Me! "Armageddon", a song by Alkaline Trio from From Here to Infirmary Armageddon, a former member of the hip hop collective Terror Squad

 Other uses 
 Armageddon (beer), a beer brewed in Scotland
 Armageddon (convention), an annual New Zealand science-fiction and comics convention
 Armageddon – Les Effets Speciaux, an attraction at Disneyland Paris
 Getter Robo Armageddon, a 1998-9 OVA and manga
 WWE Armageddon, a former annual professional wrestling pay-per-view event

 See also 
 "Arma-Goddamn-Motherfuckin-Geddon", a 2008 song by Marilyn Manson
 Armageddon 2001, a 1991 DC Comics crossover event
 "The Battle of Armageddon" (Hank Williams song), a 1949 hymn
 
 
 Harmagedon (disambiguation)
 Carmageddon (disambiguation)
 Karmageddon (disambiguation)
 Armour-Geddon'', a 1991 video game